Gol Sefid-e Dowlatabad (also Romanized as Gol Sefīd-e Dowlatābād; also known as Dowlatābād-e Gol Sefīd and Gel-e Sefīd) is a village in Chenarud-e Jonubi Rural District, Chenarud District, Chadegan County, Isfahan Province, Iran. At the 2006 census, its population was 92, in 14 families.

References 

Populated places in Chadegan County